The Common Wealth Awards of Distinguished Service (or Common Wealth Awards) were created under the will of the late Ralph Hayes, an influential American business executive and philanthropist. Hayes conceived the awards to reward and encourage the best of human performance worldwide. Hayes served on the board of directors of PNC Bank, Delaware's predecessor banks from 1935 to 1965. Through the Common Wealth Awards, he sought to recognize outstanding achievement in eight disciplines: dramatic arts, literature, science, invention, mass communications, public service, government and sociology. The awards also provide an incentive for people to make future contributions to the world community.

Ralph Hayes
Hayes worked in the Office of the United States Secretary of War in Washington, D.C., the motion picture industry, publishing, banking, and for the Coca-Cola Company. For 35 years, he was a Coca-Cola executive; he was secretary-treasurer, vice president, and as a director of Coca-Cola International. He was on the board of directors of the Bank of Delaware (now PNC Bank) from 1943 to 1965, having previously been a Director of its predecessor, The Equitable Trust Company, from 1935 to 1943. Hayes also had a long career of public service. He was a chairman of the James Foundation, president of Community Funds, Inc., and a longtime director of the New York Community Trust. He died in 1977 at the age of 82, leaving the Common Wealth Awards as part of his charitable legacy.

Prize and ceremony
Each recipient of the Common Wealth Award receives a $50,000 prize. It is presented at an annual, invitation-only, black-tie dinner hosted at the Hotel DuPont in Wilmington, Delaware.

In their 39-year history, the Common Wealth Awards have conferred $6 million in prize money to 201 honorees of international renown. The awards are funded by the Common Wealth Trust.

Common Wealth Award Writing Contest
Since 2000, more than sixty Delaware high school students have met and talked to the winning world leaders through the Common Wealth Award Writing Contest. Four winners of the writing contest and their parents or guardians are invited each year to the Common Wealth Awards ceremony, where the honorees are recognized for their lifetime achievement. As time allows, students are often able to talk directly with the winners.

Contest winners are publicly acknowledged at the Common Wealth Awards ceremony and receive a framed picture of themselves taken with the honorees.

List of honorees

See also 

 List of general science and technology awards

References

Awards established in 1979
American literary awards
International literary awards
Sociology awards